The Battle of Arroyo dos Molinos took place on 28 October 1811 during the Peninsular War. An allied force under General Rowland Hill trapped and defeated a French force under General Jean-Baptiste Girard, forcing the latter's dismissal by the Emperor Napoleon. A whole French infantry division and a brigade of cavalry were destroyed as viable fighting formations.

Background
In the middle of October, 1811 a French division under the command of Jean-Baptiste Girard crossed the River Guadiana at Mérida and campaigned in Northern Extremadura. Major-General Rowland Hill consulted with Lieutenant-General Wellington and received permission to use his 2nd Division to pursue Girard. Upon learning that the French had halted at the village of Arroyo dos Molinos, near Alcuéscar, Hill force-marched his troops for three days in poor weather so as to catch the French before they moved on.

By the evening of the 27 October, Hill's forces had reached a point four miles from the French at Arroyo dos Molinos, and had the area around the enemy surrounded. The 71st (Highland) Regiment of Foot was ordered to occupy the village of Alcuéscar, three miles from Arroyo. During the night there was a violent hail-storm, and on the following morning the weather was still so foul that the French pickets on duty had their backs turned so as to gain some reprieve from the wind and rain - it was from this direction that Hill's forces attacked at dawn on the 28th.

The French 34th and 40th Regiments suffered extremely heavy losses during the battle, although to Marshal Soult's relief the eagle standards of the two regiments were not lost to the British. He wrote to Napoleon: "L'honneur des armes est sauvé; les Aigles ne sont pas tombés au pouvoir de l'ennemi". ["The honour of the army is saved; the Eagles did not fall into the hands of the enemy".]

Long's cavalry charged, the 2nd Hussars King's German Legion particularly distinguishing themselves, and broke the French cavalry. Over 200 of them were captured plus three pieces of artillery.
 
On 5 November a jubilant Hill (who would be made a Knight of the Bath for Arroyo dos Molinos) wrote to his sister:

The French eagles may "not have fallen into the hands of the enemy", however, the 34th [Cumberland] Regiment captured six side-drums of the 34e Régiment d'Infanterie together with the drum-major’s staff, which was seized by Sergeant Moses Simpson of the 34th's Grenadier Company. Included in the haul was the French grenadier company drum, the shell of which was emblazoned with three 'flaming grenade' emblems. The drums and drum-major's staff are on display in Cumbria's Museum of Military Life at Carlisle Castle.

Order of battle

British
In no order;
2nd Division
First Brigade (Howard's)
9th (East Norfolk) Regiment of Foot
24th (The 2nd Warwickshire) Regiment of Foot
50th (Queen's Own) Regiment of Foot
One company, 5th Battalion, 60th (Royal American) Regiment of Foot
71st (Highland) Regiment of Foot
92nd (Gordon Highlanders) Regiment of Foot
Third Brigade (Wilson's)
28th (North Gloucestershire) Regiment of Foot
2nd Battalion, 34th (Cumberland) Regiment of Foot
2nd Battalion, 39th (Dorsetshire) Regiment of Foot
One company, 5th Battalion, 60th (Royal American) Regiment of Foot
Cavalry: 'D Brigade' (Long's)
9th Light Dragoons
13th Light Dragoons
2nd Hussars King's German Legion

French
Division Girard (4000)
 Brigade Dombrowski
 34th Ligne Infantry Regiment (3 battalions)
 40th Ligne Infantry Regiment (3 battalions)
 Brigade Bron 
 27th Chasseurs à Cheval (light cavalry)
 10th Hussars
 20th Dragoons

Artillery: one 8 pdr, one 4pdr, one Lgt Howitzer.

Notes

References

Further reading

In popular culture

External links
 

Battles of the Peninsular War
Battles of the Napoleonic Wars
Battles involving Spain
Battles involving Portugal
Battles involving the United Kingdom
Battles involving France
Battles in Extremadura
Conflicts in 1811
1811 in Spain
October 1811 events